Kongo religion (KiKongo: BuKongo) encompasses the traditional beliefs of the Kongo people. Some smaller ethnic groups in the region, like the Chokwe, have adopted Bakongo spirituality. The faith bases itself on a complex animistic system and a pantheon of various gods and spirits. The principle creator of the world is Nzambi Mpungu, the sovereign master. Belief in Nzambi Mpungu, who gave birth to all the other gods, the world and spirits who inhabit it, is common, but Ancestor worship builds up the main religious beliefs. Healers, known as Nganga, try to mediate between the spirit realms and the physical world, as well as heal followers' minds and bodies. Mediatory roles like being a Nganga require legitimization from the other world of spirits and ancestors. The Bakongo cosmos is split between two worlds: the top half representing the physical world, or ku nseke and the bottom half representing the spiritual world, or ku mpèmba.

History

The traditional spirituality has its roots in Bantu-speaking peoples in Africa. As the faith traveled to the Americas it retained various traditions but often mixed with other faiths. Some surviving traditions include possession by the dead to learn wisdom from the ancestors, and working with Nkisi. The religions that have preserved Kongo traditions include Hoodoo, Palo Monte, Lumbalú,  Kumina, Haitian Vodou, Candomblé Bantu, and Venezuelan Yuyu.

Creation and cosmology 
According to researcher Molefi Kete Asante, "Another important characteristic of Bakongo cosmology is the sun and its movements. The rising, peaking, setting, and absence of the sun provide the essential pattern for Bakongo religious culture. These “four moments of the sun” equate with the four stages of life: conception, birth, maturity, and death. For the Bakongo, everything transitions through these stages: planets, plants, animals, people, societies, and even ideas. This vital cycle is depicted by a circle with a cross inside. In this cosmogram or dikenga, the meeting point of the two lines of the cross is the most powerful point and where the person stands."

Kalûnga 
The Bakongo believe that in the beginning, there was only a circular void, called mbûngi, with no life. Nzambi Mpungu summoned a spark of fire, or Kalûnga, that grew until it filled the mbûngi. When it grew too large, Kalûnga became a great force of energy and unleashed heated elements across space, forming the universe with the sun, stars, planets, etc. Because of this, kalûnga is seen as the origin of life and a force of motion. The Bakongo believe that life requires constant change and perpetual motion. Nzambi Mpunga is also referred to as Kalûnga, the God of change. Similarities between the Bakongo belief of Kalûnga and the Big Bang Theory have been studied.

The nature of Kalûnga is also spiritual. As Kalûnga filled mbûngi, it created an invisible line that divided the circle in half. The top half represents the physical world, or ku nseke, while the bottom half represents the spiritual world of the ancestors, known as ku mpèmba. The Kalûnga Line separates these two worlds, and all living things exists on one side or another. After creation, the line became like a river, carrying people between the worlds at birth and death. Then the process repeats and a person is reborn. Together, Kalûnga and the mbûngi circle form the Yowa or Dikenga Cross. According to Kimbwandènde Kia Bunseki Fu-Kiau, the four corners of the cross are believed to represent: Musoni Time, when the Kalûnga begot the universe; Kala Time, when biological life began; Tukula Time, when animals were created on Earth; and Luvemba Time when Manhûga, the ancestor of all humans, lived on Earth.

Beliefs

General beliefs 

The religion of the Kongo is deeply complex. According to historian John K. Thornton "Central Africans have probably never agreed among themselves as to what their cosmology is in detail, a product of what I called the process of continuous revelation and precarious priesthood." The Kongo people had diverse views, with traditional religious thought best developed in the northern Kikongo-speaking area. There is plenty of description about Kongo religious ideas in the Christian missionary and colonial era records, but as Thornton states, "these are written with a hostile bias and their reliability is problematic". Kongo beliefs included Kilundu as Nzambi (god) or Jinzambi (gods, deities).

In general, according to the Kongo cosmogram, the highest god, next to other high gods, reside at the top of the world, the spirits and other deities living below, followed by the physical realm populated by humans and animals, with water existing in the middle where the two worlds meet.

Generally, these traditions are oral rather than scriptural and passed down from one generation to another through folk tales, songs, and festivals, include belief in an amount of higher and lower gods, sometimes including a supreme creator or force, belief in spirits, veneration of the dead, use of magic and traditional African medicine. Kongo mythology, next to other nearby traditional religions can be described as animistic with various polytheistic and pantheistic aspects. Animism builds the core concept of the all Bantu religious traditions, including the Kongo religious beliefs, similar to other traditional African religions. This includes the worship of tutelary deities, nature worship, ancestor worship and the belief in an afterlife. While some religions adopted a pantheistic worldview, most follow a polytheistic system with various gods, spirits and other supernatural beings. Traditional African religions also have elements of fetishism, shamanism and veneration of relics, and have a high complexity, comparable to Japanese Shinto or Hinduism.

Spirits as well as dead ancestors could be communed with and those with authority got special rights to such communing. The priestly Nganga can interact with such spirits and ancestors. They would use spiritual cures to battle black magic in the world, sometimes using Nkisi. Nganga are not allowed to use black magic and only assisted clients to bring upon good fortune.

Practices and charms 
Humans may manipulate the universe through the use of charms called Nkisi. Within these charms are natural objects since it is believed all natural things contain a soul. These charms protect humans either by embodying a spirit or by directing a spirit to hunt evil.

Spirits
There is lot of spirits who surrounds Nzambi a Mpungu like Nzambici, his wife (spirit of earth), Nzazi (the spirit of thunder and lightning), Ngonda (spirit of moon and menstruations) and his brother Ntangu (spirit of time and sun), Chicamassichinuinji (ruler of seas and oceans), Mpulu Bunzi or Bunzi (male or female spirit of rain), Mbumba (rainbow serpent) and his wife Funza (female spirit of waters, twin phenomenon, malformations in children) or Kalunga (spirit of death and sea).

See also
 Bantu mythology
 Hoodoo
 Nzambi Mpungu

References

Traditional African religions
Kongo culture
Religion in Africa